Sri Someswara Swamy Temple is a temple to Shiva located in Appikonda, Visakhapatnam.

History
This temple was built in 1070 by King Kulottunga I of the Chola dynasty, and referred to as the Chola Monument.

About
Someswara Temple is very popular. In this region, for Maha Shivratri more than 1 lakh (100,000) devotees will visit during the festival. The temple was declared a protected monument by the Archaeological Survey of India.

References

Hindu temples in Visakhapatnam district